The following is a list of notable events and releases of the year 1939 in Norwegian music.

Events

Deaths

 February
 11 – Gustav Fredrik Lange, violinist, composer and music teacher (born 1861).

Births

 May
 13 – Kari Løvaas, operatic soprano.
 21 – Petter Pettersson, writer and cultural worker (Moldejazz).

 July
 19 – Ketil Hvoslef, composer.

 August
 9
 Odd Børre, pop singer.
 Ove Stokstad, printmaker, jazz clarinetist and saxophonist (died 2018).
 18 – Harald Heide-Steen Jr., actor, comedian and jazz singer (died 2008).
 27 – Bjarne Fiskum, violinist, conductor and composer.

 October
 18 – Jan Erik Vold, poet, jazz vocal reciter, singer, translator, and author.
 30 – Kari Diesen Jr., entertainer (died 2016).

See also
 1939 in Norway
 Music of Norway

References

 
Norwegian music
Norwegian
Music
1930s in Norwegian music